Protection against Accidents (Dockers) Convention, 1929 (shelved) is  an International Labour Organization Convention.

It was established in 1929:
Having decided upon the adoption of certain proposals with regard to the protection against accidents of workers employed in loading or unloading ships,...

Modification 

The concepts contained in the convention were revised and included in ILO Convention C32, Protection against Accidents (Dockers) Convention (Revised), 1932, and again in ILO Convention C152, Occupational Safety and Health (Dock Work) Convention, 1979.

Ratifications
Prior to it being shelved, the convention had been ratified by four states.

External links 
Text.
Ratifications.

Health treaties
Shelved International Labour Organization conventions
Occupational safety and health treaties
Treaties concluded in 1929
Treaties entered into force in 1932
Admiralty law treaties